Sarah is a common feminine given name of Hebrew origin.   It derives its popularity from the biblical matriarch Sarah, the wife of Abraham and a major figure in the Abrahamic religions. It is a consistently popular given name across Europe, North America, and the Middle East—being commonly used as a female first name by Jews, Muslims, and Christians alike, and remaining popular also among non-religious members of cultures influenced by these religions. 

In Hebrew, Sarah (שָׂרָה‎) is the feminine form of the noun Sar (שַׂר), which commonly translates to "chief", "ruler" or "prince". It is also related to the verb שָׂרָה‎, which is also the basis of the name Israel. In Modern Hebrew, Sarah (שָׂרָה‎) is the feminine form of the word for "minister".

In the United States, Sarah has been counted among the top 150 given names since 1880, when name popularity statistics were first recorded in the United States. Sarah ranked among the top 10 names from 1978 to 2002, reaching a plateau of popularity from the early 1980s to 1988. Every year since and including 1989 it has fallen in popularity, but it remained the 30th most popular name for newborn girls in 2010. Its most common variant spelling, Sara, was number 121.

The name has been similarly popular in Ireland and the United Kingdom. In England, it gained popularity after the Protestant Reformation. In 2014, Sarah ranked as the tenth most popular female baby name in Ireland.

In Nazi Germany, female Jews who did not have "typically Jewish" given names were forced to add "Sara" as of January 1939, whereas males were forced to add "Israel".

Translations 

 Albanian: Sara
 Amharic: ሳራ (Sara)
 Arabic: سارة
 Aramaic:ܣܪܐ
 Armenian: Սառա
 Azerbaijani: Sara
 Bashkir: Сара (Sara)
 Belarusian: Сара (Sara)
 Balochi: saraa
 Bengali: সারাহ (Sārāha)
 Biblical Greek: Sarra
 Biblical Latin: Sara
 Bosnian: Sara
 Bulgarian: Сара (Sara)
 Catalan: Sara
 Chinese Simplified: 莎拉 (pinyin: Shā lā)
 Chinese Traditional: 莎拉 (pinyin: Shā lā)
 Croatian: Sara
 Czech: Sára
 Danish: Sara
 Dutch: Sarah, Sara
 Estonian: Saara
 English: Sarah, Sara
 Faroese: Sára
 Finnish: Saara, Sari, Saija, Salli, Sara
 French: Sarah
 German: Sarah, Sara
 Greek: Σάρα (Sára)
 Gujarati: સારાહ (Sārāha)
 Haitian Creole: Sara
 Hawaiian: Kala
 Hebrew: שרה (Sārā)
 Hindi: सराह (Sarāha)
 Hungarian: Sára, Sári, Sárika, Sarolta, Sasa
 Icelandic: Sara
 Iranian: سارا
 Italian: Sara
 Irish: Sorcha, Saraid, Sarah
 Japanese: サラ (Sara), 沙羅 (Sara)
 Kannada: ಸಾರಾ (Sārā)
 Khmer: សារ៉ា (Sara)
 Korean: 사라 (Sara)
 Lithuanian: Sara
 Macedonian: Сара (Sara)
 Maori: Hara
 Marathi: सारा (Sārā)
 Mongolian: Сара (Sara)
 Malayalam: സാറ, Sara, Saramma
 Nepali: सारा (Sārā)
 Norwegian: Sara
 Persian: سارا
 Polish: Sara 
 Portuguese: Sara
 Romanian: Sara
 Russian: Сара (Sara), Sarka, Sarra
 Sanskrit: सार (Sara)
 Serbian: Сара/Sara
 Slovak: Sára
 Slovene: Sara
 Somali: Sara
 Spanish: Sara, Sarita, Zara
 Swedish: Sara
 Tamil: சாரா (Cārā)
 Telugu: సారా (Sārā)
 Thai: ซาร่าห์ (Sā r̀ā h̄̒)
 Tigrigna: ሳራ (Sara)
 Turkish: Sare
 Uzbek: Sora
 Ukrainian: Сара (Sara)
 Urdu: سارہ
 Vietnamese: Sara
 Welsh: Sara
 Yiddish: שרה (Soro), Sirke

Other forms 

 Other variants of the name are: Sara (alternatively pronounced )
 Pet forms of the name are: Sally, Sadie

See also
 Sarah (disambiguation)

References

Given names of Hebrew language origin
Hebrew feminine given names
English feminine given names
Jewish feminine given names
Arabic feminine given names
Scandinavian feminine given names
Pakistani feminine given names
Feminine given names